Gunlock is an unincorporated community in Magoffin County, Kentucky, United States.  It lies along Route 7 southeast of the city of Salyersville, the county seat of Magoffin County.  Its elevation is 1,001 feet (305 m).

A post office was established in the community in 1936. The first postmaster is said to have taken the name Gunlock from a newspaper article he read about a western ranch. Its post office, with the ZIP code of 41632, closed in 1998.

References

Unincorporated communities in Magoffin County, Kentucky
Unincorporated communities in Kentucky